Eddie Lee (July 28, 1899 – August 20, 1979) was a character actor from the 1930s through the 1950s.  Of Asian descent, he played mainly bit parts such as cooks and soldiers.  While most of his over 80 roles were uncredited, he did have a few significant roles, such as in 1935's Sunset Range, Panic on the Air (1936), and 1943's The Man From Thunder River.

Filmography

(Per AFI database)

I'll Cry Tomorrow (1955) as Chinese Grocer
Soldier of Fortune (1955) as Sentry
Hell and High Water (1953) as Chinese Submarine Commander 
China Venture (1953) as Guerrilla
Target Hong Kong (1953) as Pirate
I Was an American Spy (1951) as Japanese MP 
Mask of the Dragon (1951) as Chin Koo - Korean Curio Shop Owner
Mister 880 (1950) as Chinese Interpreter
Bells of Coronado (1949) as Shanghai, the Cook
Malaya (1949) as Japanese Aide 
The Clay Pigeon (1949) as White Lotus Cashier 
Boston Blackie's Chinese Venture (1948) as Fantan Player
Half Past Midnight (1948) as Chinese Man in Alley
To the Ends of the Earth (1947) as Chian Soo 
Saigon (1947) as Teahouse Merchant
Singapore (1946) as Waiter
Calcutta (1946) as Jim Wong, Bank Clerk
Frontier Gal (1945) as Wing Lee
Nob Hill (1945) as Chinese Man
God Is My Co-Pilot (1944) as Kichiburo's Staff Officer
Dragon Seed (1944) as City Man
Marine Raiders (1944) as Japanese Officer
And the Angels Sing (1944) as Manager of Chinese Café
Broadway Rhythm (1944) as Chinese Waiter
The Purple Heart (1943) as Army Aide
Rookies in Burma (1943) as Japanese Radio Operato
Destination Tokyo (1943) as Japanese at Listening Post
Jack London (1943) as Japanese Sergeant
Headin' for God's Country (1943) as Gim Lung
Salute to the Marines (1943) as Japanese Officer
Behind the Rising Sun (1943) as Sergeant
The Man from Thunder River (1943) as Wong
China (1943) as Guerrilla
Reunion in France (1942) as Japanese Man
China Girl (1942) as Doctor
Across the Pacific (1942) as Chinese Hotel Clerk
Submarine Raider (1942) as Takeo
Tarzan's New York Adventure (1942) as Sun Lee's Assistant
Pacific Rendezvous (1942) as Japanese Man
A Tragedy at Midnight (1942) as Chinese Laundry Worker
A Yank on the Burma Road (1942) as Chinese Lieutenant
Man from Cheyenne (1941) as Houseboy
Moonlight in Hawaii (1941) as Charlie 
Burma Convoy (1941) as Leon
The Stork Pays Off (1941) as Chinese Man
The Big Store (1941) as Chinese Father
Girls Under 21 (1940) as Chinese Waiter
Barricade (1939) as Wah - Consulate Servant
Torchy Blane in Chinatown (1938) as Chinese Boy
Too Hot to Handle (1938) as Chinese Officer
International Settlement (1938) as Rickshaw Driver
West of Shanghai (1936) as Wang Chung - the Assassin
The Cowboy and the Kid (1936) as Chinese Laundryman
Roaming Lady (1936) as Chinese Seaman
Panic on the Air (1936) as McNulty
Charlie Chan in Shanghai (1935) as Servant
Without Regret (1935) as Chinese Officer
Here Comes Cookie (1935) as Chang
Mary Jane's Pa (1935) as Chinese Man
Sunset Range (1935) as Lee Fong the Cook
George White's 1935 Scandals (1935) as Chinese Man
The Painted Veil (1934) as Fane's Chinese Servant
She Learned About Sailors (1933) as Rickshaw Driver

References

External links 

1899 births
1979 deaths
Male actors from Los Angeles